Pramod Kumar Yadav may be:
Pramod Kumar Yadav (Nepali poilitician)
Pramod Kumar Yadav (Siraha politician)